North Karanpura Coalfield is located in Ranchi, Hazaribagh, Chatra and Latehar districts in the Indian state of Jharkhand.

Overview
In 1917, L.S.S.O’Malley described the coalfields in the upper reaches of the Damodar as follows: "Near the western boundary of Jharia field is that of Bokaro, covering" , "with an estimated content of 1,500 million tons; close by… is the Ramgarh field (40 square miles), in which, however, coal is believed to be of inferior quality. A still larger field in the same district is that called Karanpura, which extends over"  "and has an estimated capacity of 9,000 million tons."

The Coalfield
There are large numbers of seams in the North Karanpura Coalfield, some with thicknesses over 72 feet.

Reserves
Geological reserves in the North Karanpura Coalfield in million tonnes as on 1/4/2010:

Projects

Transport
In 1927, Bengal Nagpur Railway opened the  Barkakana-Muri-Chandil line to traffic. In the same year the Central India Coalfields Railway opened the Gomoh-Barkakana line. It was extended to Daltonganj in 1929. Later these lines were amalgamated with East India Railway. 
The 57 km long Hazaribagh-Barkakana section of the Koderma-Hazaribagh-Barkakana-Ranchi line was opened for passenger trains on 7 December 2016 by the railway minister Suresh Prabhu in the presence of chief minister Raghubar Das.

Coal-bed methane
ONGC's preliminary assessment of coal-bed methane indicates that four Damodar Valley coalfields – Jharia, Bokaro, North Karanpura and Raniganj – to be the most prospective.

See also
South Karanpura Coalfield

References

Coalfields of India
Mining in Jharkhand
Hazaribagh district
Ranchi district
Chatra district
Latehar district